is a multi-purpose stadium at the Gifu Memorial Center in Gifu, Japan.  It is currently used mostly for football matches.  It is the host of FC Gifu.  The stadium was originally opened in 1991 and has a capacity of 26,109 spectators.

It serves as the start and finish point for the annual Gifu Seiryu Half Marathon each May.

References

External links
stadium information

Football venues in Japan
Rugby union stadiums in Japan
Multi-purpose stadiums in Japan
FC Gifu
Sports venues in Gifu Prefecture
Athletics (track and field) venues in Japan
Buildings and structures in Gifu
Sports venues completed in 1991
1991 establishments in Japan